Fürstenwalde (Spree) Süd station is a railway station in the municipality of Fürstenwalde (Spree) in the district Oder-Spree of Brandenburg. It is served by the line .

References

Railway stations in Brandenburg
Buildings and structures in Oder-Spree
Railway stations in Germany opened in 1911
1911 establishments in Prussia